Rock Painting (Finnish title Värikallio) was the first album of the Finnish composer Osmo Tapio Räihälä, released in 2006. The music on the album is performed by the Uusinta Chamber Ensemble. The album consists of seven works, written between 1997 and 2004.

Track listing

Personnel
Osmo Tapio Räihälä – composer, producer (all tracks)
Eva Ollikainen – conductor (7)
Lauri Toivio – flute (2, 7)
Riikka Talvitie – oboe (2)
Anni Haapaniemi – oboe (7)
Kimmo Leppälä – clarinet (2)
Marko Portin – clarinet (7)
Janne Pulkkinen – bassoon (7)
Reeta Rossi – French horn (7)
Emil Holmström – piano (5, 7)
Reeta Maalismaa – violin (1, 3)
Maria Puusaari – violin (1-3, 5-7)
Mirka Malmi – violin (7)
Max Savikangas – viola (3, 7)
Markus Hohti – violoncello (3-4, 7)
Henrika Fagerlund – double bass (7)

Notes
The solos on the track Rock Painting are improvised by Lauri Toivio (flute), Max Savikangas (viola) and Marko Portin (clarinet).

References

2006 albums
Osmo Tapio Räihälä albums
Uusinta Ensemble albums
Instrumental albums